Polina Paraskevi Misailidou is a Greek singer, who is better known in her own country simply as Polina.

Polina was born and raised in Nea Smyrni, a suburb in south Athens. She started her career in 1977 singing the song "Lives" at the Thessaloniki Song Festival. In 1979, Polina appeared at the Eurovision Song Contest as a backup singer to Elpida as she performed the entry "Sokrati".

However, that would be her only time going to Eurovision. She was picked in the 1986 national selection to represent Greece at Eurovision Song Contest 1986 in Bergen, Norway, but Ellinikí Radiofonía Tileórasi, Greece's national broadcaster, pulled out of the Contest unexpectedly. Polina stated that it was due to political troubles in Greece at the time, but she noted that a Eurovision website had learned that the real reason was that the Contest was to be held the night before Orthodox Easter. Had she performed, she would have appeared eighteenth and she would have performed the song "Wagon-lit".

She is best known for the string of chart successes she had in Greece in the late 1980s and early 1990s, including "Birimpa", "Pink Bikini", "Let's Go to the Seychelles", "Wagon Lit", "Contrares", "Radio, My love","Rumours was released", "Push-Ups", "Awesome" and "Ιn Thessaloniki". She has also collaborated with several well-known composers, like Stamatis Kraounakis, Harry Chalkitis, Costas Haritodiplomenos, Nikos Karvelas, Yannis Karalis, Kostas Bigalis, Yiannis Miliokas, Thanos Kalliris, Kostas Tournas, Phoebus and others, particularly Stamatis Kraounakis, with whom she has had a working relationship since the release of her Birimpa album in 1986.

See also
Greece in the Eurovision Song Contest
1980s#Music

References

External links
Official site 

Year of birth missing (living people)
Living people
Eurovision Song Contest entrants for Greece
21st-century Greek women singers
Greek pop singers
20th-century Greek women singers
Singers from Athens
Thessaloniki Song Festival entrants